Christmas Wish is a Christmas EP by American singer Stacie Orrico. It was released by ForeFront Records on October 9, 2001. The album peaked at number 26 on the US Top Holiday Albums.

Critical reception

AllMusic editor Tim Sendra reated the album three out of five stars.

Track listing

Notes
The two Japanese bonus tracks were available in the US in December 2003 on an exclusive Target single titled For Christmas.

Charts

Release history

References 

2001 Christmas albums
2001 debut EPs
Albums produced by the Underdogs (production team)
Christmas albums by American artists
Christmas EPs
ForeFront Records EPs
Stacie Orrico albums
Pop Christmas albums